The Berkeley Beacon is the student newspaper of Emerson College, founded in 1947. The paper is published weekly on Thursdays during the fall and spring semesters of Emerson's academic year. 

In 2012, the Beacon redesigned its website, making it the first college newspaper website with a responsive design.

History
The first issue of The Berkeley Beacon was published on February 1, 1947, under the direction of editor-in-chief Paul Mundt. According to lore, the paper was named after the college's location; at the time, Emerson was situated in Back Bay, at the confluence of Berkeley Street and Beacon Street. However the name might actually refer to the famous weather beacon atop the Berkeley Building, which was completed the same year.

The Beacon has contributed to several student movements at the college, including the first student demonstration in Emerson history in 1968. It published a letter from the college president Richard Chapin decrying the Vietnam War. In 1977, an editorial in The Beacon pointed out a number of inaccuracies in a college report which was attempting to secure accreditation from the New England Association of Schools and Colleges. In 1997, The Beacon broke a story about a female student's on-campus sexual assault, which the administration had failed to address.

Notable alumni
 Morton Dean, television correspondent and news anchor for CBS Evening News and Good Morning America
 Brendan McCarthy, investigative editor for The Boston Globe and 2021 Pulitzer Prize winner 
 Dan Bigman, former business editor of The New York Times and managing editor of Forbes
 Cyndi Roy Gonzalez, former communications director for Massachusetts Attorney General Maura Healey
 Matt Porter, Boston Bruins beat writer for The Boston Globe
 Molly Driscoll, former culture editor for The Christian Science Monitor
 Nathan Hurst, political editor for C-SPAN

References

External links 
 The Berkeley Beacon (official website)

Emerson College
Publications established in 1947
1947 establishments in Massachusetts